BNS Surovi is a River class minesweeper of the Bangladeshi Navy, commissioned in 1995.

History
This ship served in Royal Navy as HMS Dovey (M2005). She was commissioned on 30 March 1985. She was assigned to the Clyde Division of Royal Navy Reserve. She was withdrawn from service in 1993. In 1995, she was sold to Bangladesh.

Career
BNS Surovi was commissioned in Bangladesh Navy on 27 April 1995. She is currently being used as a patrol ship.

Armament
The ship carries one Bofors 40 mm Mark III gun which can be used in both anti-surface and anti-air role. She also carries two L44A1 7.62 mm general purpose machine guns.

See also
List of active ships of the Bangladesh Navy
BNS Shapla
BNS Shaikat
BNS Shaibal

References

Ships of the Bangladesh Navy
Minesweepers of the Bangladesh Navy